The Battle of Krasnoi (Krasny) was a series of skirmishes fought from 15 to 18 November 1812 during the final stage of Napoleon's retreat from Moscow. In this engagement the Russians under General Kutuzov inflicted heavy losses on the remnants of the Grande Armee, which was severely weakened by attrition. Neither Kutuzov nor Napoleon allowed this clash to escalate into a full battle. Throughout the four days of combat, Napoleon sought to rush his troops, extended in a 50-mile line of march, past the Russians, who were positioned parallel to the highway. Despite the vast superiority of the Russian army, Kutuzov refrained from launching a full offensive as he did not want to risk a pitched battle against Napoleon.

The climax of the engagement occurred on 17 November, when an aggressive feint by the French Imperial Guard induced Kutuzov to delay a potentially decisive final attack. This sacrificial maneuver enabled Napoleon to evacuate a large part of his army before the Russians seized Krasny. Napoleon managed to avoid a complete defeat.

Despite Napoleon's successful rear guard action, overall the encounter was ruinous for the French. The corps of Davout, Eugene, and Ney suffered heavy defeats in individual actions during the four days of fighting. Russian Cossacks took large numbers of prisoners, and the Grande Armee was forced to abandon much of its remaining artillery and baggage train.

The forces converge on Krasny

Napoleon retreats from Smolensk

After departing from Moscow on 18 October with 100,000 combat-ready but undersupplied troops, Napoleon's strategic objective was to quarter his army for the winter at the closest French supply depot, which was at Smolensk,  to the west. Kutuzov had forced Napoleon after the Battle of Maloyaroslavets to retreat northwest over Mozhaisk to Smolensk on the devastated route of his advance that he had wished to avoid. During the three-week march to Smolensk, however, the Grande Armée was devastated by a combination of factors: starvation, demoralization, breakdown in troop discipline, a crippling loss of horses and essential supplies, attacks from the Russian army, constant harassment by its Cossack irregulars and partisans. The condition of the Grande Armée was further degraded by sub-zero temperatures in the "Russian Winter", the first two weeks of November.

By the time the French arrived at Smolensk on 9 November, the strategic situation in Russia had turned decisively against Napoleon. Only 40% men of what was left of the Grande Armée was still under arms at this point. The ravaged condition of his forces and French defeats on other fronts, Napoleon realized his position at Smolensk was untenable surrounded by Russian armies, threatening his retreat. The new strategic goal was to put the Grande Armée into winter quarters further west, in the area of the massive French supply depot of Minsk.

Having lost contact with Kutuzov during the previous two weeks, Napoleon incorrectly believed that the Russian army must have been as devastated by the elements as his own. Not expecting an offensive by Kutuzov, Napoleon made the strategic mistake of resuming his retreat by dispatching the Grande Armée's corps individually from Smolensk on four successive days, starting on 13 November. Napoleon left on the 14th, Davout on the 15th, Beauharnais on the 16th, Ney on the 17th, together with Joseph Barbanègre, the city commandant.

On 14 November, the corps of Józef Zajączek (V Corps) and Junot, as the vanguard of the retreating French army, passed through Krasny and continued marching west to Orsha. The next day, 15 November, Napoleon himself arrived at Krasny with his 16,000-strong Imperial Guard. There Napoleon planned to remain for several days so that the 6,000 troops of Eugène's IV Corps, the 9,000 troops of Davout's I Corps, and the 8,000 troops of Ney's III Corps could unite with him before he resumed his retreat. Ney's corps formed the rearguard and was not to leave Smolensk until 17 November, after destroying the city walls. Marching between and around these French corps were nearly 40,000 troops who had disintegrated into mobs of unarmed, disorganized stragglers.

Kutuzov's southern march

During the same period, the main Russian army under Kutuzov followed the French on a parallel southern road. Because this route passed through countryside unaffected by previous campaigning, the Russian army approached Krasny much less weakened by attrition than the Grande Armée.

Based on faulty intelligence reports, Kutuzov believed that only one third of the French army was retreating through Krasny toward Orsha, with Napoleon and the balance of his forces marching much farther to the north. Kutuzov therefore accepted a plan proposed by his staff officer, Colonel Toll, to march on Krasny to destroy what was believed to be an isolated French column.

The Russian position at Krasny began forming on 15 November, when the 3,500-strong flying advance guard of Adam Ozharovsky seized the town. The same day, the 16,000 troops of Miloradovich took position at Rshavka, a village located alongside the eastern road leading into Krasny. Meanwhile, Kutuzov's 35,000-strong main force slowly approached Krasny from the south, taking position several miles away from the town.

In all, Kutuzov had 50,000 to 60,000 regular troops at his disposal at Krasny, including a large cavalry force and approximately 500 cannon. Kutuzov's main body was divided into two columns. The larger force, led by General Alexander Tormasov, formed the left flank. The second column, commanded by Prince Dmitry Golitsyn, held the army's center. Miloradovich's position at Rshavka represented the Russian right flank.

15 November: the rout of Ozharovsky

15 November saw the first actions in and around Krasny as the 16,000-strong Imperial Guard, led personally by Napoleon, marched past Miloradovich's troops, who were positioned on the high ground parallel to the road. Impressed by the order and composure of the elite guardsmen, Miloradovich decided not to attack them, and settled instead for bombarding the French at extreme range. The Russian cannon fire inflicted little damage on the Guard, which continued moving toward Krasny.

During the afternoon of the 15th, the Imperial Guard was harassed on the road between Nikolino and Lyskovo by the Cossacks of General Vasily Orlov-Denisov. The eyewitness description of this encounter by the Russian partisan leader Denis Davidov, which eloquently portrays the comportment of the Old Guard and Napoleon, has become one of the most often quoted in the histories of the 1812 war:

Later that day, Napoleon and his Guard entered Krasny, and his troops forced the withdrawal of the squadrons of Cossacks under General Ozharovsky who were in possession of the village. Napoleon promptly made plans to remain in Krasny for several days so that the rest of his army could catch up with him.

Shortly after midnight, Napoleon detected the campfires of Ozharovsky's 3,500-strong force near Kutkovo, south of Krasny. Recognizing that Ozharovsky's position was dangerously isolated from Kutuzov's main army, Napoleon dispatched the Young Guard on a surprise attack against the Russian encampment, which was not protected by pickets. The operation was first entrusted to General Jean Rapp, but at the last moment Napoleon replaced Rapp with General Francois Roguet then divided the Guardsmen into three columns and began a silent advance on Ozharovsky's camp. In the ensuing combat, the Russians were taken completely by surprise and, despite their fierce resistance, were totally routed. As many as half of Ozharovsky's troops were killed or captured, and the remainder threw their weapons in a lake nearby Krasny and fled south. Lacking cavalry, Roguet was unable to pursue Ozharovsky's remaining troops.

16 November: the defeat of Eugène

Miloradovich attacks
The next day, 16 November, however, went much better for the Russians as Miloradovich's soldiers cut the road leading to Krasny and inflicted heavy losses on the French corps of Prince Eugène de Beauharnais. In this skirmishing, Eugène's IV Corps lost one third of its original force of 6,000, as well as its baggage train and artillery. Eugène fooled the Russian general attacking his army on the left flank, but managed to escape the heights on right side and succeeded to connect with Napoleon and his Imperial Guard. He was saved from total destruction only because Kutuzov, who did not want the skirmishing to expand into a full-scale battle, ordered Miloradovich to restrain himself and reposition his troops closer to the main army at Shilova. A force of Cossacks was left to harass Eugène while Miloradovich's final attack was postponed to the next day.

Kutuzov at Zhuli

Earlier that day, Kutuzov's main army finally arrived within  of Krasny, taking up positions around the villages of Novoselye and Zhuli. Kutuzov could have attacked Krasny immediately, but he chose not to.

That evening, under pressure from his aggressive subordinate generals to move decisively against the French, Kutuzov finally made plans for an offensive, but he firmly forbade his commanders from executing the attack until daylight on 17 November, which meant the French would have the entire evening to evacuate Krasny unharassed by the Russians.

The Russian battle plan called for the army to execute a three pronged attack on Krasny. Miloradovich was to remain east of the village near Lyskovo, and attack Eugène's IV Corps and Davout's I Corps. The main army at Novoselye and Zhuli would break into two groups: Prince Golitsyn would advance directly west through Uvarovo against Krasny with 15,000 troops. Alexander Tormasov with 20,000 troops was to encircle Krasny from the west by marching through Kutkovo to Dobroye, where they would cut the French retreat route to Orsha. Ozharovsky's flying column—reinforced since its drubbing by the Young Guard—would operate independently west and north of Krasny.

Sometime after 1:00 a.m. on 17 November, Kutuzov learned from prisoners that Napoleon would be remaining in Krasny, and not withdrawing before the Russian attack as Kutuzov had expected. Kutuzov now had second thoughts about executing the Russian army's planned offensive.

17 November: Napoleon's bold maneuver

Davout in peril

At 3:00 a.m. on 17 November, the 9,000 troops of Davout's I Corps decamped from their bivouac near Rzhavka and began a forced march to Krasny. The reports of Eugène's defeat the previous day were so dismaying that Davout felt it necessary to abandon his original plan of postponing his movement until Ney's III Corps, still at Smolensk, had caught up with him.

Miloradovich, permitted by Kutuzov to recommence his attack, opened a massive artillery barrage on Davout near Yeskovo. The panicked French troops began fleeing from the road, and as Russian infantry and cavalry attacks were likely to follow, the I Corps was soon threatened with destruction.

"The first corps was thus preserved, but we learned at the same time, that our rear-guard could no longer defend itself at Krasnoi; that Ney was probably still at Smolensk, and that we must give up waiting for him any longer. Napoleon, however, still hesitated; he could not determine on making this great sacrifice."

Napoleon orders the Guard to advance
Davout's peril, and the distressing developments of the previous day had alerted Napoleon to the grave danger confronting the Grande Armée. Waiting for Davout and Ney in Krasny was no longer feasible, given that any kind of determined attack by Kutuzov would destroy the Grande Armée.

At this critical juncture, Napoleon's "sense of initiative" returned to him for the first time in weeks. In Caulaincourt's words: "This turn of events, which upset all the Emperor's calculations... would have overwhelmed any other general. But the Emperor was stronger than adversity, and became the more stubborn as danger seemed more imminent."

Immediately, before daylight, Napoleon prepared his Imperial Guard to make an aggressive feint against Miloradovich and the main Russian army, gambling that this unexpected maneuver would discourage the Russians from attacking Davout. The Grande Armée's remaining artillery was massed for combat, and the Guardsmen formed themselves into attack columns.

Simultaneously, the remnant of Eugène's IV Corps was ordered to advance west from Krasny, to secure the Grande Armée's escape route to Orsha.

Napoleon's hope was to fend off the Russians just long enough to collect Davout's and Ney's troops, and to immediately resume his retreat before Kutuzov attacked or outflanked him by moving on Orsha.

The Imperial Guard moves forward

At 5:00 a.m., 11,000 Imperial Guardsman marched out of Krasny intending to secure the terrain immediately east and southeast of the village. These troops split into two columns: one 5,000 strong moving along the road to Smolensk, the other 6,000 Young Guardsmen led by Roguet, marching south of the road toward Uvarovo. The left flank of the Young Guard's column was protected by a battalion of elite Old Guard grenadiers, described by Segur as forming a "fortress like square." Stationed on the right of these columns were the weak remnants of the Guard's cavalry. Overall direction of the operation was entrusted to Marshal Mortier.

This feint of the Guard was lent additional melodrama by the personal presence of Napoleon. With his birch walking stick in hand, Napoleon placed himself at the helm of his Old Guard grenadiers, declaring "I have played the Emperor long enough! It is time to play general!"

Facing the tattered but resolute Imperial Guardsmen were densely concentrated Russian infantry columns to the south and east, supported by massive, powerful artillery batteries. Lacking sufficient cannon of their own, the Guardsmen were badly outgunned by the enemy. As described by Segur: "Russian battalions and batteries barred the horizon on all three sides—in front, on our right, and behind us"

Kutuzov's reaction to the Imperial Guard's forward movement led to the most decisive and controversial development of the battle: he promptly cancelled his army's planned offensive, even in spite of the Russians' overwhelming superiority in strength.

For most of the rest of this day, the Russians remained at a safe distance from the Guard, beyond the reach of French muskets and bayonets, and simply blasted the Young Guard with cannon fire from afar.

Action near Uvarovo

The limited close quarters combat that did occur on this day unfolded throughout the morning and early afternoon around Uvarovo. The Imperial Guard attacked Uvarovo in order to use the village to cover Davout's retreat into Krasny.

Uvarovo was held by two battalions of Golitsyn's infantry, which formed a weak forward outpost in advance of the rest of the Russian army. The Russians were soon driven from Uvarovo, as Kutuzov forbade Golitsyn from reinforcing his troops. Golitsyn reacted by commencing a devastating artillery barrage on Uvarovo, which took a terrible toll on the Young Guardsmen.

Kutuzov, in order to mass as much strength as possible behind Golitsyn, at this point ordered Miloradovich to shift his position west, so that it linked with Golitsyn's lines. Kutuzov's decision to realign Miloradovich's troops is remarkable, as the bulk of the Russian army—Golitsyn's and Tormasov's commands—were already merged in a powerful defensive position. Miloradovich was thus denied the chance to complete the destruction of Davout.

Meanwhile, to the north, Davout's troops began streaming into Krasny, harassed by swarms of Cossacks who made no serious attempt to stop them. The Russian artillery continued to pound Davout's corps with grapeshot, inflicting ruinous casualties on the I Corps. Most of Davout's baggage train was lost, but a significant number of his infantrymen had been saved, and they were rallied by their officers in Krasny.

Next, General Bennigsen, second in seniority only to Kutuzov among Russian generals, ordered Golitsyn to recapture Uvarovo. Golitsyn's attack was met by a simultaneous counterattack by a column of the Guard's voltigeurs.

Golitsyn attacked the voltigeurs with two regiments of cuirassiers; the French formed squares and repelled the attack. During the third Russian attack they became trapped and without ammunition, and soon the entire contingent of Light Infantry was killed or captured; the 33rd regiment light infantry ceased to exist. A second line of (Dutch) grenadiers, which had been advancing to support the voltigeurs, then fell back under heavy Russian cannon fire.  The grenadiers were driven from a critical defensive position with massive casualties. Roguet attempted to support the Dutch by attacking the Russian artillery batteries, but this offensive was broken up by Russian grapeshot and cavalry charges. Only fifty soldiers and eleven officers of the Grenadiers survived this encounter.

Napoleon retreats

Around 11:00 a.m., as the Imperial Guard was holding firm near Uvarovo despite its withering losses, Napoleon received intelligence reports that Tormasov's troops were readying to march west of Krasny. This news, coupled with the Young Guard's mounting casualties, forced Napoleon to abandon his ultimate object of standing down Kutuzov long enough for Ney's III Corps to arrive in Krasny. If Kutuzov opted to attack, the Grande Armée would be encircled and destroyed. Napoleon immediately ordered the Old Guard to fall back on Krasny, and then join Eugène's IV Corps in marching west toward Liady and Orsha. The Young Guard, nearing its breaking point, would remain near Uvarovo, to be relieved shortly thereafter by Davout's reorganized troops from Krasny.

Napoleon's decision was not an easy one to make. Segur describes the beleaguered Emperor's predicament as follows:

In short order, the Old Guard was following the IV Corps moving west out of Krasny, and the road to Orsha was clogged with soldiers and their wagonry. Huge mobs of civilians, fugitives, and stragglers preceded the retreating French troops.

Meanwhile, near Uvarovo the Young Guard's capacity to resist the Russians was deteriorating rapidly, and Mortier ordered a retreat before his remaining troops were surrounded and destroyed. As if on parade ground drill, the perfectly disciplined Guardsmen then turned about face and marched back to Krasny, absorbing a final, terrible barrage of Russian cannonshot as they retired.

Only 3,000 of the Young Guard's original 6,000 troops had survived the Russian shelling near Uvarovo. 17 November may have been the bloodiest day in the Young Guard's entire history.

The Young Guard's retreat did not end once it returned to Krasny. Mortier and Davout were so wary of the possibility that the inert Kutuzov might attack that they immediately joined the throng of troops, mobs and wagons rushing that moment to Liady. Only a weak rearguard under General Friedrich was left to hold Krasny. Ney's III Corps, having departed Smolensk only that morning, would not find Davout's I Corps in Krasny awaiting him.

Kutuzov delays the pursuit

Miloradovich and Golitsyn were not permitted by Kutuzov to attack Krasny for several more hours.

At 2:00 p.m., satisfied that the French were in full retreat and not intending to resist his troops' advance, Kutuzov finally allowed Tormasov to begin his enveloping movement west through Kutkovo and north to Dobroye. It would take Tormasov two hours to reach his destination, however, by which time the opportunity to encircle and destroy the Grande Armée would be past.

Sometime around 3:00 p.m., Golitsyn's troops rushed into Krasny like a torrent, and Friedrich's rearguard quickly crumbled.

Simultaneously, on the western road to Liady, the French initially encountered an ambush by the small detachments of Ozharovsky and Rosen. A bedlam of exploding grapeshot, overturned wagons, careening carriages, and mobs of fugitives rushing in panic ensued. But the troops of Cobert and Latour-Maubourg forced the Russians aside, and Napoleon was finally marching on Orsha.

The final noteworthy event of the day occurred in Dobroye, when the hind end of the I Corps baggage train, including Davout's personal carriages, fell to the Cossacks. Among the booty captured by the Russians were Davout's war chest, a plethora of maps of the Middle East, Central Asia and India, and Davout's Marshal baton.

By nightfall on 17 November, Kutuzov had occupied Krasny and its surroundings with his 70,000 troops. Marshal Ney, still advancing on Krasny from the east, was not yet aware the Grande Armée was no longer in Krasny to receive his III Corps.

18 November: the destruction of Ney's III Corps

At 3:00 p.m. on 18 November, Ney's III Corps finally made contact with Miloradovich, who had posted 12,000 troops on a hill overlooking a ravine  with the marshy brook Losvinka. Ney had 8,000 combatants and 7,000 stragglers under his command at this point.

Believing that Davout was still in Krasny, directly behind Miloradovich's columns, Ney turned down a Russian offer of honorable surrender, and boldly attempted to ram his way through the enemy. The dogged French troops then succeeded in piercing the first two lines of Russian infantry. The third line, however, proved indomitable, and at the decisive moment, the Russians counterattacked (the battle at the brook Losvinka). An eyewitness to this engagement, the English General Sir Robert Wilson, describes it thus:

The terrible defeat of the III Corps was thorough enough to induce the chivalrous Miloradovich to extend another honorable surrender to Ney. In the early evening Ney decided to escape silently passing the Russians and following the brook Losvinka. When the Cossacks appeared during the night Ney succeeded to cross the Dnieper, one by one, but lost a thousand men in the ice-cracks when crossing the river, leaving his guns and carriages behind. The elements and the Cossacks reduced Ney's contingent to only 800 diehards.

For the next two days Ney's small party bravely stood off Cossack attacks as it marched westward along the river in search of Napoleon's army. Again, Ney refused to submit, and with 2,000 refugees—all that remained of his corps—he absconded into the forests pursued by Platov's Cossacks. On 20 November, Ney and Napoleon were reunited near Orsha, an event which the demoralized French troops regarded as the emotional equivalent of a great victory.

At Krasny, Ney's steely courage in defeat led Napoleon to bestow upon him the sobriquet of "Bravest of the Brave."

Summary of results

Total French losses in the Krasny skirmishes are estimated between 6,000 and 13,000 killed and wounded, with another 20,000 to 26,000 lost as prisoners to the Russians. Almost all of the French prisoners were stragglers. The French also lost approximately 200 artillery pieces and a huge portion of their supply train. Russian losses are estimated to have been no more than 5,000 killed and wounded.

Significant however was that Napoleon successfully led 75% of the combatants of the I and IV Corps and the Imperial Guard out of Krasny, thus salvaging his hope of using these troops as a nucleus around which he could rebuild his army for the Battle of Berezina and the War of the Sixth Coalition.

Krasny was a Russian victory, but a highly unsatisfactory one. Tsar Alexander I was enraged with Kutuzov upon learning of the old field marshal's failure to totally destroy the French. Nonetheless, owing to Kutuzov's immense popularity with the Russian aristocracy, Alexander gave him the victory title of Prince of Smolensk for what had been accomplished in this battle.

The sources are unclear as to why Kutuzov did not decide to annihilate the last remaining French troops during the offensive. Russian military historian General  pointed to Kutuzov's unwillingness to risk the lives of his exhausted and frostbitten troops and cited the words of the field marshal, "All that [the French army] will collapse without me". General Robert Wilson, the British liaison officer attached to the Russian Army, recorded Kutuzov as having commented in late 1812,

In popular culture
Leo Tolstoy references the battle in his War and Peace. Throughout the novel, but particularly in this section, Tolstoy defends Kutuzov's actions, arguing that he was less interested in the glory of routing Napoleon than in saving Russian soldiers and allowing the French to continue destroying themselves with a swift retreat.

See also
List of battles of the French invasion of Russia

Notes

References
 Napoleon's Russian Campaign of 1812, Edward Foord, Boston, Little Brown and Company, 
 Russia Against Napoleon, Dominic Lieven, Penguin Books, 
With Napoleon in Russia, Caulaincourt, William Morrow and Company, New York, 
Napoleon in Russia: A Concise History of 1812, Digby Smith, Pen & Sword Military, 
The War of the Two Emperors, Curtis Cate, Random House, New York, 
Narrative of Events during the Invasion of Russia by Napoleon Bonaparte, and the Retreat of the French Army, 1812, Sir Robert Wilson, Elibron Classics, 
Moscow 1812: Napoleon's Fatal March, Adam Zamoyski, HarperCollins, 
The Fox of the North: The Life of Kutusov, General of War and Peace, Roger Parkinson, David McKay Company, 
Napoleon 1812, Nigel Nicolson, Harper & Row, 
The Napoleonic Wars, The Rise and Fall of an Empire, Gregory Fremont-Barnes & Todd Fisher, Osprey Publishing, 
The Greenhill Napoleonic Wars Data Source, Digby Smith, Greenhill Books, 
The Campaigns of Napoleon, David Chandler, The MacMillan Company, 
Napoleon's Invasion of Russia 1812, Eugene Tarle, Oxford University Press, 
Napoleon's Russian Campaign, Philippe-Paul de Segur, Time-Life Books, 
1812 Napoleon's Russian Campaign, Richard K. Riehn, John Wiley & Sons, Inc., 
Napoleon in Russia, Alan Palmer, Carrol & Graf Publishers, 
In the Service of the Tsar Against Napoleon, by Denis Davydov, Greenhill Books, 
Atlas of World Military History, Brooks, Richard (editor)., London: HarperCollins, 2000.

External links
 During the Patriotic War of 1812 the second battle by Krasnoye village was fought
 The Battle of Krasnoi. The Hermitage continues to present battle paintings by Peter von Hess
 The Life of Napoleon Buonaparte, Emperor of the French. By the Author of “Waverley,” (Sir Walter Scott) Abridged by an American gentleman (1827)
 Campagne de Russie de 1812
 The Anatomy Of Glory; Napoleon And His Guard, A Study In Leadership by Commandant Henri Lachouque

,

Battles of the French invasion of Russia
Battles of the Napoleonic Wars
Battles inscribed on the Arc de Triomphe
Battles involving France
Battles involving Russia
Conflicts in 1812
November 1812 events
1812 in the Russian Empire
History of Smolensk Oblast
Smolensk Governorate